Bosnia and Herzegovina competed at the 2018 Mediterranean Games in Tarragona, Spain from 22 June to 1 July 2018.

Medal summary

Medal table

|  style="text-align:left; width:78%; vertical-align:top;"|

|  style="text-align:left; width:22%; vertical-align:top;"|

Athletics

Men's

Boxing

Men

Canoeing

Men

Football

Men

Judo

Men

Women

Karate

Men's kumite

Women's kumite

Rhythmic gymnastics

Women

Shooting

Women

Swimming

Men

Women

Paralympic Swimming
Men

Table tennis

Women

Taekwondo

Men

Tennis

Women

Volleyball

Women

Weightlifting

Men

References

Nations at the 2018 Mediterranean Games
2018
Mediterranean Games